Chances is a 1931 American pre-Code war drama film directed by Allan Dwan and starring Douglas Fairbanks, Jr. It is based on the 1930 novel by A. Hamilton Gibbs.

According to Fairbanks, the film was a hit.

Plot
In 1914, brother officers Jack and Tom Ingleside are in London, headed home on furlough. In the dense fog, Jack bumps into a young woman and tries to pick her up. She laughs at him, promises they will meet again, and rides off in a cab. When the brothers arrive at the family home, their mother is having tea with Molly Prescott, a childhood neighbor who has grown to be a lovely young woman—the woman in the fog. Tom tells his mother that he has always loved Molly. Jack, who is known as a ladies' man, is smitten.

Mrs. Ingleside is holding a benefit ball for the Red Cross, and Archie, Ruth and Sylvia, friends of the boys, spend the weekend. Sylvia is Jack's old flame. Jack and Molly step away from the dance. He tries to tell her how he feels and she laughingly replies, "How many girls have you said that to?" but they kiss. She returns to the dance where Tom is waiting.

When their mother tells Jack of her joy at the love between Tom and Molly, he is shocked as he had thought that Tom was not interested in girls. Heartbroken, he makes love to Sylvia in Molly's presence. Wounded, Molly turns away. Meanwhile, they have been called back to France and their artillery unit. Tom asks Molly to wait for him. Ecstatic, he tells Jack of the engagement, and Jack congratulates him.

At the front, bodies and debris fill a gun emplacement and the communicating trench. Lieutenant Taylor brings the news and dies. Jack is assigned to take a crew of volunteers to put the gun back in order, returning over the same terrain that killed Taylor. The mission is a success, but four men die. The major sends Jack on leave. Tom gives him a letter for Molly, who does not write to him. In a French town, Jack sees Molly, who is driving for the army. She confesses that she agreed to marry Tom out of anger, and she cannot bear his letters. She asks for one day of Jack's leave. He agrees to come back early. She promises to write to Tom and tell him the truth.

They meet as planned and visit the shore. She did not write to Tom. Jack says "Saying goodbye is to die a little." He puts a ring on her left hand. She gives him a picture. They have an hour left, perhaps their last, and she cannot bear to let him go. She curls up on the grass, weeping. They embrace passionately.

At the front, Jack says that it was impossible to talk to their mother as there was a stone wall between them. Tom observes that the letters they send home are lies, just another thing that they will have to conceal when the war is over.

Tom takes Jack's coat by mistake and finds Molly's picture. He assumes that Jack had forgotten to give it to him, but when he teases Jack about it, the truth emerges. Tom, furious and betrayed, refuses to listen.

Major Bradford is ordered to withdraw his artillery group. Men, teams of horses and wagons race to a new position under a constant barrage. They fire on the advancing German infantry, then remove the breech blocks and fall back to their trenches, still under constant fire. Tom lingers by the guns, apparently in despair. Calling Tom, Jack returns through barbed wire and across shattered ground to reach his brother, now wounded. He drags Tom back.

Jack has lost his left arm and walks with a cane. Molly steps out to meet him and they kiss. Tom has died, but Jack finds consolation in the fact that his brother said that they were pals at the end. They walk together into the fog.

Cast
 Douglas Fairbanks, Jr. as Jack Ingleside
 Rose Hobart as Molly Prescott
 Anthony Bushell as Tom Ingleside
 Holmes Herbert as Major Bradford
 Mary Forbes as Mrs. Ingleside
 Edmund Breon as The General

Uncredited:
 Billy Bevan as Cuthbert, Pub Waiter
 Florence Britton as Sylvia
 David Cavendish as Bit
 Tyrell Davis as Archie
 Ethel Griffies as Drunk Flower Vendor
 Ruth Hall as Girl at Party
 Forrester Harvey as Joe, News Vendor
 Mae Madison as Ruth
 Edward Morgan as Lt. Wickham
 Jameson Thomas as Lt. Taylor

Reception 
In a contemporary review for The New York Times, critic Mordaunt Hall wrote: "It is a thoroughly human story of war and love, taken from A. Hamilton Gibbs's novel. It rings true in every episode, nothing being overdone, for which Alan Dwan, the director, deserves much credit. The fighting scenes are vividly produced and the romance is etched splendidly. ... This picture is a glowing example of the value of adhering to an author's story. The fact that it has not been tampered with unduly is the reason for its compelling quality, for no silly scenario tricks are permitted to interrupt the flow of events. Mr. Dwan unfurls his tale with commendable restraint, giving through the turning of railroad coach wheels, those of an automobile or those of a motorcycle, a definite conception of the passage of time."

Preservation status
The film has been preserved at the Library of Congress.

References

External links

1931 films
1931 romantic drama films
American romantic drama films
American war drama films
American black-and-white films
Films based on British novels
Films directed by Allan Dwan
Films set in London
First National Pictures films
War romance films
Warner Bros. films
American World War I films
1930s war drama films
1930s English-language films
1930s American films